Iropoca is a monotypic moth genus in the subfamily Lymantriinae erected by Alfred Jefferis Turner in 1904. Its only species, Iropoca rotundata, the iropoca moth, was first described by Francis Walker in 1855. It is found in the Australian states of Victoria, New South Wales and Queensland.

The wingspan is about 30 mm for males while females are wingless. Males have a pattern of light and dark brown markings on the forewings and plain brown hindwings.

The larvae feed on the foliage of various Eucalyptus species.

References

Taxa named by Alfred Jefferis Turner
Moths described in 1855
Lymantriinae
Monotypic moth genera
Moths of Australia